The Tadoba Andhari Tiger Reserve is a wildlife sanctuary in Chandrapur district of Maharashtra state in India. It is Maharashtra's oldest and largest national park. Created in 1955, the reserve includes the Tadoba National Park and the Andhari Wildlife Sanctuary.

Etymology
"Tadoba" is taken from the name of the god "Tadoba" or "Taru", worshipped by the tribes who live in the dense forests of the Tadoba and Andhari region, while "Andhari" refers to the Andhari river that meanders through the forest.

History
Legend holds that Taru was a village chief who was killed in a mythological encounter with a tiger. Taru was deified and a shrine dedicated to Taru now exists beneath a large tree on the banks of Tadoba Lake. The temple is frequented by adivasis, especially during a fair held annually in the Hindu month of Pausha (December–January).

The Gond kings once ruled these forests in the vicinity of the Chimur hills. Hunting was banned in 1935. Two decades later, in 1955,  of this forest area was declared a national park. Andhari Wildlife Sanctuary was created in the adjacent forests in 1986. In 1995, the park and the sanctuary were merged to establish the present tiger reserve.

Geography 
Tadoba Andhari Reserve is the largest national park in Maharashtra.

To the southwest is the  Tadoba Lake which acts as a buffer between the park's forest and the extensive farmland which extends up to Irai water reservoir. This lake is a perennial water source which offers a good habitat for Muggar crocodiles to thrive. Other wetland areas within the reserve include Kolsa Lake and the Andhari river.

Tadoba Reserve covers the Chimur Hills, and the Andhari sanctuary covers the Moharli and Kolsa ranges. Nearest village from this place is Durgapur. It is bounded on the northern and western sides by densely forested hills. Thick forests are relieved by smooth meadows and deep valleys as the terrain slopes from north to south. Cliffs, talus, and caves provide refuge for several animals. The two forested rectangles are formed of the Tadoba and Andhari ranges. The south part of the park is less hilly than the remainder.

Weather and Climate of Tadoba
Winters stretch from November to February; during this season, daytime temperatures are in the 25°–30 °C range and the park is lush green. While summers are extremely hot in Tadoba, with the temperature rising to 47 °C, it is the ideal time to sight mammals near lakes as vegetation is minimal. The monsoon season begins in June; the area receives heavy rainfall during this season (approx.1275 mm) and humidity hovers around 66%.

After the scorching summers where the mercury rises up to 48 degrees, the arrival of monsoon in June is a big relief. Though the climate becomes highly humid, the rains do not fail to revive the jungle.  As the rains make the terrain inaccessible the core zones of the Tadoba Andhari Tiger Reserve are closed between July and September and only buffer zone is open for the tourists. The visit to Tadoba National Park in monsoon is a sheer bliss where you can witness a completely different Tadoba.

Winter is the ideal time to explore Tadoba with lush greenery around. Starting from October winter lasts till February. Though the winters are not very cool in Tadoba the temperature ranges between 20°C and 30°C.

Flora

Tadoba Reserve is a predominantly southern tropical dry deciduous forest with dense woodlands comprising about eighty seven per cent of the protected area. Teak is the predominant tree species. Other deciduous trees found in this area include ain (crocodile bark), bija, dhauda, hald, salai, semal and tendu. Beheda, hirda, karaya gum, mahua madhuca (crepe myrtle), palas (flame-of-the-forest, Butea monosperma) and Lannea coromandelica (wodier tree). Axlewood (Anogeissus latifolia, a fire-resistant species), black plum and arjun are some of the other tropical trees that grow in this reserve.

Patches of grasses are found throughout the reserve. Bamboo thickets grow throughout the reserve in abundance. The climber kach kujali (velvet bean) found here is a medicinal plant used to treat Parkinson's disease. The leaves of bheria are used as an insect repellent and bija is a medicinal gum. Beheda is also an important medicine found here.

Fauna

According to Dr Bilal Habib, Head of Wildlife Institute of India's Department of Animal Ecology and Conservation Biology, 88 individual Tigers were recorded using the SECR Methodology in 2020 (44 in the core zone, 23 in the buffer zone and 21 in the core and buffer zone). There are about 115 plus tigers in Tadoba, 88 in the forest and 27 immediately outside the reserve.

Aside from the keystone species, the Bengal tiger, Tadoba Tiger Reserve is home to other mammals, including: Indian leopards, sloth bears, gaur, nilgai, dhole, small Indian civet, jungle cats, sambar, barking deer, chital, chausingha and honey badger. Tadoba lake sustains

the marsh crocodile, which was once common all over Maharashtra. Reptiles here include the endangered Indian python and the common Indian monitor. Terrapins, Indian star tortoise, Indian cobra and Russel's viper also live in Tadoba.The lake contains a wide variety of water birds, and raptors. 195 species of birds have been recorded, including three endangered species. The grey-headed fish eagle, the crested serpent eagle, and the changeable hawk-eagle are some of the raptors seen in the park.
Other bird species found in the reserve include the orange-headed thrush, Indian pitta, crested treeswift, stone curlew, crested honey buzzard, paradise flycatcher, bronze-winged jacana, lesser goldenbacked woodpecker, various warblers, black-naped blue flycatcher and the Indian peafowl.74 species of butterflies have been recorded including pansies, monarchs, mormons and swordtails. Insect species include the endangered danaid egg-fly and great eggfly. Dragonflies, stick insects, jewel beetles and the praying mantis are other insects in the reserve. The signature spider, giant wood spider and red wood spiders are often seen during the monsoon and soon after. Some hunting spiders like the wolf spiders, crab spiders and lynx spiders are also common.
A black panther was spotted in May 2018. As per the officials, it is a rare sight since black panthers normally live in evergreen forests and not in dry deciduous forests like Tadoba Tiger Reserve.

Threats
There are 41,644 people living in and around the reserve in fifty nine villages of which five are inside the core zone. These villages in the core zone still farm inside the core area. The process of rehabilitation is going on. Recently the Navegaon village was rehabilitated, and grassland is expected on the place where the village existed. There are 41,820 cattle within the core and buffer zone. While cattle grazing is not allowed in the core zone, regulated grazing in the buffer zone is allowed to cattle of the village inhabitants. However, cattle in peripheral villages sometimes find their way into the reserve and cause additional damage to the habitat.

Forest fires are a constant problem in the dry season, consistently burning between 2% and 16% of the park each year. The killing of domestic livestock by tigers and leopards is a frequent phenomenon in neighboring villages. This has an adverse impact on the economic condition of the local people and results in a negative view of the reserve management. In the year 2013, at least four people and 30-50 cattle were killed by leopards, tigers or sloth bears. Densely forested hills form the northern and western boundary of the tiger reserve.

Reaching Tadoba

Reaching Tadoba By Road
Chandrapur and Nagpur are well connected to all important cities through national highways and hence access to Tadoba National Park is easy via Chandrapur and Nagpur even by road.

The approximate distance of Tadoba National Park from major cities of India is as below.

Nagpur to Tadoba – 132 Km, 2h 55 min (via Chandrapur – Mul – Nagbhir – Nagpur Hwy)

Pune to Tadoba- 788 Km, 13h 39 min (Via NH222)

Raipur to Tadoba – 333 Km, 5h 33 min (Via NH6)

Hyderabad to Tadoba – 435 Km, 8h 15 min (Via NH7)

Thane to Tadoba- 897 Km, 13h 37 min (via NH6)

Aurangabad to Tadoba – 530 Km, 10h (Via SH207)

Jabalpur to Tadoba- 416 Km, 7h 30 min (Via NH7)

Mumbai to Tadoba – 919 Km, 14h 21 min (Via NH6)

Bangalore to Tadoba – 1,075 Km, 15h 50 min (Via NH7)

Secunderabad to Tadoba – 479 Km, 7h 58 min (Via NH7)

Nasik to Tadoba – 754 Km, 11h 32 min (Via NH6)

Bhopal to Tadoba- 501 Km, 8h 12 min (Via NH69)

Reaching Tadoba By Air
Dr. Babasaheb Ambedkar International Airport is the nearest airport to Tadoba National Park. Regular flights fly from Mumbai, Pune, Delhi, Bengaluru, Hyderabad, Chennai and Kolkata to Nagpur one can hire a cab or local transport from the airport to reach Tadoba. It is advisable to pre-book the transport

Reaching Tadoba By Rail
45 km away from the Tadoba national park is the nearest railway station, Chandrapur.
Located on New Delhi–Chennai main line of Indian Railways it receives trains from many major cities of India.
Nagpur Railway Station is also a good option for tourists who wish to visit Tadoba via train. Nagpur is a Major railway Junction nicely connected to the important cities and towns of the rest of India. Tourists after reaching Nagpur can take a cab, or bus to reach Tadoba
National Park.

Another good option to travel to Tadoba via train is Balharshah Junction railway station located on New Delhi-Chennai main line of Indian railways, all major trains halt here. The oldest and most popular gate Moharli gate is approx 1 hours 30 min from Balharshah

References

External links

 Tiger conservation: Maharashtra villagers get first instalment of rehab package, The Hindu, 29 February 2012
 Chandrapur-information portal
 Incredible Tadoba

Central Deccan Plateau dry deciduous forests
Tiger reserves of India
Chandrapur district
Wildlife sanctuaries in Maharashtra
National parks in Maharashtra
Protected areas established in 1955
1955 establishments in Bombay State
Tourist attractions in Maharashtra